J. Neil Carmelo Garcia earned his AB Journalism, magna cum laude, from the University of Santo Tomas in 1990; MA in Comparative Literature in 1995, and PhD in English Studies: Creative Writing in 2003 from the University of the Philippines Diliman. He is a Professor of English, creative writing and comparative literature at the College of Arts and Letters, University of the Philippines Diliman, where he also serves as an Associate for Poetry at the Likhaan: U.P. Institute of Creative Writing.

Garcia is the author of numerous poetry collections and works in literary and cultural criticism, including Closet Quivers (1992), Our Lady of the Carnival (1996), The Sorrows of Water (2000), Kaluluwa (2001), Slip/pages: Essays in Philippine Gay Criticism (1998), Performing the Self: Occasional Prose (2003), The Garden of Wordlessness (2005), and Misterios and Other Poems (2005). Garcia's groundbreaking study, Philippine Gay Culture: The Last Thirty Years (1996), was awarded a National Book Award by the Manila Critics Circle in 1996. An editor of the famous Ladlad series of Filipino gay writing, Garcia also edited for the Likhaan, the following anthologies: The Likhaan Book of Philippine Criticism (1992–1997) and The Likhaan Book of Poetry and Fiction (1998 and 2000).

Garcia's latest critical work, Postcolonialism and Filipino Poetics: Essays and Critiques, is a revised version of his very provocative Ph. D dissertation. The book examined Filipino poetics from the perspective of post-colonialism consisting of the author's own critical and personal reflections on poetry-both as he "reads" and "writes" it. Garcia sought to answer a specific and difficult question: just how do the dominant poetic theories in the Philippines address the problems and debates of postcolonialism? This inquiry led Garcia to confront the issue of Filipino nationalism. Garcia addressed the assumptions and consequences of Filipino nationalism then engaged with the poetics of National Artist Virgilio Almario and eminent poet-critic Gemino Abad, whom Garcia referred to as "the foremost commentators on Filipino poetics."

Garcia is currently working on a full-length book, a post-colonial survey and analysis of Philippine poetry in English. Professor Garcia has won several literary awards including the Palanca and the National Book Award from the Manila Critics Circle. He has also received grants and fellowships to deliver lectures in Taipei, Hawaii, Berkeley, Manchester, Cambridge, Leiden and Bangkok.

Works

Poetry
Closet Quivers, 1992
Our Lady of the Carnival, 1996
Sorrows of Water, 2000;
Kaluluwa: New and Selected Poems, 2001
The Garden of Wordlessness, 2005
Misterios and Other Poems, 2005

Cultural Criticism
Philippine Gay Culture: The Last Thirty Years, 1996
Slip/pages: Essays in Philippine Gay Criticism, 1998
Postcolonialism and Filipino Poetics: Essays and Critiques, 2004

Creative Non-Fiction
Closet Queeries, 1997
Myths and Metaphors, 2002
Performing the Self: Occasional Prose, 2003

Anthologies (as editor)Ladlad, 1994;Ladlad 2, 1996;The Likhaan Book of Philippine Criticism, 1992–1997The Likhaan Book of Poetry and Fiction, 1998 & 2000Bongga Ka 'Day: Gay Quotes to Live by, 2002Ladlad 3'', 2007

Honors and awards
British Council Fellowship Grant to Cambridge
British Academy Fellowship
Taipei International Artist-in-Residence
Visiting ICOPHIL Fellow at the International Institute of Asian Studies, Leiden, the Netherlands
Procyon Poetry Prize
National Book Awards from the Manila Critics Circle
Palanca Awards for Literature
Philippines Free Press Literary Awards for Poetry
U.P. Gawad Chancellor for Outstanding Literary Artist,
U.P. Gawad Chancellor for Outstanding Literary Work,
U.P. Gawad Chancellor for Outstanding Research
U.P. Gawad Chancellor as Artist of the Year
Outstanding Thomasian Writers Award
29th National Writers' Workshop, Dumaguete
U.P. National Writers' Workshop

References 

Filipino non-fiction writers
University of Santo Tomas alumni
Filipino LGBT writers
Living people
University of the Philippines Diliman alumni
Year of birth missing (living people)